

Results
Arsenal's score comes first

Football League First Division

Final League table

FA Cup

References

1910-11
English football clubs 1910–11 season